George Washington Wilson (August 30, 1924 – October 29, 1974), nicknamed "Teddy", was an American outfielder in Major League Baseball.

Basically a corner outfielder, Wilson was most often used as a pinch hitter during his majors career. He played for the Chicago White Sox, New York Giants and New York Yankees in parts of three seasons spanning 1952–1956. In a three-season MLB career, he hit .191 with three home runs and 19 runs batted in in 145 games played.

A member of the 1956 World Series champion Yankees, he also played in Japan from 1963 to 1964 for the Nishitetsu Lions. Overall, his professional career spanned 23 seasons, beginning in 1942 in the minor leagues and ending in 1964 with the Lions. He also had two productive seasons for the Navegantes del Magallanes of the Venezuela Winter League and played in the 1955 Caribbean Series.

Sources

1924 births
1974 deaths
American expatriate baseball players in Japan
Baseball players from North Carolina
Birmingham Barons players
Canton Terriers players
Chicago White Sox players
Denver Bears players
Durham Bulls players
Louisville Colonels (minor league) players
Major League Baseball outfielders
Minneapolis Millers (baseball) players
Minor league baseball managers
Navegantes del Magallanes players
American expatriate baseball players in Venezuela
New York Giants (NL) players
New York Yankees players
Nishitetsu Lions players
Owensboro Oilers players
People from Cherryville, North Carolina
Roanoke Red Sox players
Rochester Red Wings players
Shelby Colonels players
Statesville Owls players